The 2014 Southern Jaguars football team represented Southern University in the 2014 NCAA Division I FCS football season. The Jaguars were led by second-year head coach Dawson Odums. The Jaguars played their home games at Ace W. Mumford Stadium and were a member of the West Division of the Southwestern Athletic Conference (SWAC). They finished the season 9–4, 8–1 in SWAC play to win the West Division title. As West Division champions, they played East Division champions Alcorn State in the SWAC Championship Game where they lost 24–38.

Schedule

References

Southern
Southern Jaguars football seasons
Southern Jaguars football